Ardozyga celidophora is a species of moth in the family Gelechiidae. It was described by Turner in 1919. It is found in Australia, where it has been recorded from Queensland.

The forewings are pale-brown, with the markings and a few scattered scales fuscous. There is an outlined blotch, ill-defined dorsally, including the plical and first discal, a dot above the middle second discal at two-thirds and a large tornal and terminal blotch which is narrower at the apex. There are also some whitish-brown terminal dots. The hindwings are whitish-ochreous with the apical one-third grey.

References

Ardozyga
Moths described in 1919
Moths of Australia